HWJ may refer to:

 History Workshop Journal, a British academic history journal published by Oxford University Press
 H. W. J. Thiersch (1817–1885), German Evangelical theologian and philologist